Nicole Kersh is an Australian entrepreneur. She is the founder and former managing director of 4cabling, an Australian-based cabling and IT accessories manufacturer.

Career
Kersh is the founder of business 4cabling, a direct-to-consumer manufacturer, wholesaler and retailer of cabling and IT management accessories in Australia. She started the business in 2006 in her parents’ garage. Kersh, who at the time was a 21-year-old university student, founded her company following her experiences with her parents’ electrical cabling company. To create the site, she taught herself HTML and tracked her business while attending university lectures. Kersh owns 51 per cent of 4cabling and her mother the remaining 49 per cent.

In May 2014, Kersh sold the business to private equity firm Gernis Holdings.

Kersh is also the founder of marketing agency The Content Folk, and works as an eCommerce specialist based in Sydney.

Personal life
Kersh was born in South Africa. Kersh received a degree in Media and Communications from the University of New South Wales and resides in Sydney, Australia.

See also
 Female entrepreneur

References

External links

Nicole Kersh interview with Women as Entrepreneurs

Australian women in business
1984 births
Living people
Businesspeople from Sydney
Australian women company founders
Australian company founders